Professor Mark C. Berger (July 24, 1955 – April 30, 2003), was the director of The Center for Business and Economic Research at the University of Kentucky until his death at age 47.  He was also a Fulbright Scholar at University College Dublin. Originally hailing from Sylvania, Ohio, Berger earned his BA from the University of Toledo and his MA and PhD from Ohio State University.

Career
University of Kentucky 1981 to 2003
Director of the Center for Business and Economic Research
William B. Sturgill Professor of Economics
Associate Professor
University College Dublin 2002 to 2003
Fulbright Scholar
University of Chicago 1987 to 1988
Visiting Professor
University of Vienna in Austria 1996
Visiting Professor

Death
Berger died of a seizure, after returning to Kentucky from Ireland to receive treatment for recently diagnosed cancer.  During the chemotherapy Berger was given a different seizure medication which did not prevent the fatal seizure.

Articles mentioning Berger
 Kentucky Economics (Page 2)

Known works of Mark Berger 
 Do Workers Pay for On-the-Job Training? Barron, John M., Mark C. Berger, and Dan A. Black. 1999.  Journal of Human Resources 34(2):235-252.
 Compensating Differentials in Emerging Labor and Housing Markets: Estimates of Quality of Life in Russian Cities by Mark C. Berger, Glenn C. Blomquist, Klara Sabirianova Peter (October 2003)
 Worker Training in a Restructuring Economy: Evidence from the Russian Transition by Mark C. Berger, John S. Earle, Klara Sabirianova Peter (September 2001)
 Berger, Mark C.; Hirsch, Barry T., "The Effects of Cohort Size on the Earnings Growth of Young Males." Mimeograph. Department of Economics, University of Kentucky, n.d..
 Berger, Mark C.; Black, Dan A.; Scott, Frank A.; Chandra, Amitabh, "Health insurance coverage of the unemployed: COBRA and the potential effects of Kassebaum-Kennedy." Journal of Policy Analysis and Management. Sum 1999, 18, (3), 430 - 448.
 Berger, Mark C.; Black, Dan A.; Scott, Frank A., "How well do we measure employer-provided health insurance coverage." Contemporary Economic Policy. July 1998, 16, (3), 356 - 367.
 Barron, John M.; Berger, Mark C.; Black, Dan A., "How Well Do We Measure Training?." Journal of Labor Economics. 1997, 15, (3, part 1), 507 - 528.
 Scott, Frank A.; Berger, Mark C.; Garen, John E., "Do health insurance and pension costs reduce the job opportunities of older workers?." Industrial and Labor Relations Review. July 1995, 48, (4), 775.
 Berger, Mark C., "Demographic Cycles, Cohort Size, and Earnings." Demography. May 1989, 26, (2), 311.
 Berger, Mark C.; Leigh, J. Paul, "Schooling, self-selection, and health." Journal of Human Resources. Sum 1989, 24, (3), 433 - 455.
 Scott, Frank A.; Berger, Mark C.; Black, Dan A., "Effects of the Tax Treatment of Fringe Benefits on Labor Market Segmentation." Industrial and Labor Relations Review. January 1989, 42, (2), 216 - 229.
 Berger, Mark C., "Predicted Future Earnings and Choice of College Major." Industrial and Labor Relations Review. April 1988, 41, (3), 418 - 429.
 Berger, Mark C.; Blomquist, Glenn C.; Waldner, Werner, "A Revealed-Preference Ranking of Quality of Life for Metropolitan Areas." Social Science Quarterly. December 1987, 68, (4), 761 - 778.
 Berger, Mark C.; Hirsch, Barry T., "Veteran Status as a Screening Device During the Vietnam Era." Social Science Quarterly. March 1985, 66, (1), 79 - 89.
 Berger, Mark C., "Cohort Size and the Earnings Growth of Young Workers." Industrial and Labor Relations Review. July 1984, 37, (4), 582 - 591.
 Berger, Mark C., "Changes in labor force composition and male earnings: A production approach." Journal of Human Resources. Spr 1983, 18, (2), 177 - 196.
 Berger, Mark C.; Hirsch, Barry T., "The civilian earnings experience of Vietnam-Era veterans." Journal of Human Resources. Aut 1983, 18, (4), 455 - 479.
 Mark Berger, Dan Black, and Frank Scott, "Is There Job Lock?" Southern Economic Journal 70, April 2004, 953-976.
 Eric Thompson, Frank Scott, and Mark Berger, "Deregulation in the Electric Utility Industry: Excess Capacity and the Transition to a Long Run Competitive Market," Growth and Change 35, Winter 2004, 1-21.
 Mark Berger, Dan Black, Amitabh Chandra, and Frank Scott, "Children, Nondiscriminatory Provision of Fringe Benefits, and Household Labor Market Decisions," Research in Labor Economics vol. 22 (Worker Well-being and Public Policy, S. W. Polachek, ed.) 2003, 309-349.
 Mark Berger, Dan Black, Jodi Messer, and Frank Scott, "COBRA, Spouse Coverage, and Health Insurance Decisions of Older Households," Journal of Forensic Economics 15, Spring/Summer 2002, 147-164.
 Dan Black, Mark Berger, and Frank Scott, "Bounding Parameter Estimates with Non-Classical Measurement Error," Journal of the American Statistical Association 95, September 2000, 739-748.
 Mark C. Berger, Dan A. Black, Frank A. Scott, and Amitabh Chandra, "Health Insurance Coverage of the Unemployed: COBRA and the Potential Effects of Kassebaum-Kennedy," Journal of Policy Analysis and Management 18, Summer 1999, 430-448.
 Mark C. Berger, Dan A. Black, and Frank A. Scott, "How Well Do We Measure Employer-Provided Health Insurance?" Contemporary Economic Policy 16, July 1998, 356-367.
 John Garen, Mark Berger, and Frank Scott, "Pensions, Non-Discrimination Policies, and the Employment of Older Workers," The Quarterly Review of Economics and Finance 36, Winter 1996, 417-429.
 Frank A. Scott, Mark C. Berger, and John E. Garen, "Do Health Insurance Costs and Non-Discrimination Policies Reduce the Job Opportunities of Older Workers?" Industrial and Labor Relations Review 48, July 1995, 775-791.

External links
IZA

Education in Lexington, Kentucky
Ohio State University alumni
People from Sylvania, Ohio
1955 births
2003 deaths